Estagel is a commune in the Pyrénées-Orientales department in southern France.

Geography

Localisation 
Estagel is located in the canton of La Vallée de l'Agly and in the arrondissement of Perpignan.

Population

Notable people 
 François Arago (1786-1853), scientist and politician.
 Jacques Arago (1790-1855), writer, artist and explorer.
 Joseph Gaudérique Aymerich (1858-1937), military officer and colonial administrator.

See also
Communes of the Pyrénées-Orientales department

References

Communes of Pyrénées-Orientales